Elections to Ipswich Borough Council (IBC) are currently taking place as of 5 May 2022. 17 seats will be contested – one in each of the 16 wards, plus an additional bye election in St John's Ward.

The Conservatives failed to capitalise on any of the gains they had made in the previous year, and lost two seats to Labour. They made noticeable progress in traditionally strong Labour areas such Bridge, Gainsborough and Sprites, although failed to make gains. They lost Holywells and Stoke Park to Labour, which are traditionally stronger areas for the party.

Labour, who increased their majority from 12 to 16, made two gains from the Conservatives but actually saw their vote share fall on 2018, when this round of seats were last fought.

The Liberal Democrats saw their overall votes across the Borough remain static, but scored their best ever result in St Margaret’s ward, which is a stronghold for them. 

The Green Party made the most progress in terms of vote share but failed to win a seat. Their support rose most in more central areas such as Alexandra and Holywells.

Timetable
IBC published the following timetable:
 28 March: Formal notification of election
 5 April: Deadline for election
 6 April: Publication of  candidates statements
 14 April: Last day for voter registration
 5 May: Poll, 07:00 to 22:00

Summary

Statement of persons nominated
IBC published the statement of the persons nominated for election as a Borough Councillor on 5 April 2022. The Labour Party retained control of the Council.

Election result

Results comparison based on 2018 elections in which UKIP stood, but did not contest these elections.

Ward results

Alexandra

Bixley

Bridge

Castle Hill

Gainsborough

Gipping

Holywells

Priory Heath

Rushmere

Sprites

St. John's

(2 seats up due to by-election)

St. Margaret's

Stoke Park

Westgate

Whitehouse

Whitton

By-elections

Priory Heath

A by-election was called due to the resignation of Cllr Sarah Barber.

References

Ipswich Borough Council elections
Ipswich